Sarab-e Qaht (also Romanized as Sarāb-e Qaḩţ; also known as Sar-e Owqāt and Sar-i-Aūqāt) is a village in Panjeh Ali Rural District, in the Central District of Qorveh County, Kurdistan Province, Iran. At the 2006 census, its population was 73, in 18 families. The village is populated by Kurds.

References 

Towns and villages in Qorveh County
Kurdish settlements in Kurdistan Province